Brik-Alga (Berek-Alğa) is a rural locality (a village) in Malinovsky Selsoviet, Belebeyevsky District, Bashkortostan, Russia. The population was 50 as of 2010. There is 1 street.

Geography 
Brik-Alga is located 14 km south of Belebey (the district's administrative centre) by road. Aksakovo is the nearest rural locality.

References 

Rural localities in Belebeyevsky District